Alberto López Fernández (born 20 May 1969) is a Spanish former professional footballer who played as a goalkeeper, currently a manager.

He spent the bulk of his career at Real Sociedad, for whom he appeared in 377 competitive matches.

Playing career

Real Sociedad
A product of Basque Country giants Real Sociedad's youth system, López was born in Irun, and made his first appearances with the first team in the closing stages of the 1992–93 season, having played understudy to the inconsistent Javier Yubero for most of the year. He would be the undisputed starter from the following campaign onwards, missing only a total of seven La Liga games in the next seven years (in 1997–98, as Real ranked third, he played all 38 matches and conceded 37 goals).

López had to compete for the starting job with newly signed Sander Westerveld from 2001–02 onwards. He finished the season with 18 appearances, but had just one the following campaign as the Dutchman was first choice for the runners-up.

Valladolid
Following the emergence of another youth product at Real Sociedad, Asier Riesgo, López was deemed surplus to requirements and joined Real Valladolid in the Segunda División on a one-year deal. In 2006–07, he helped the side to return to the top flight after a three-year absence while also collecting a Ricardo Zamora Trophy – 36 matches, 29 goals.

In the following season, López acted as backup and helped develop wonderkid Sergio Asenjo (20 years his junior), and had his contract extended until June 2009 after which he retired at the age of 40.

Coaching career
López started working as a manager in 2011, with Real Unión's reserves. He joined Juan Carlos Mandiá's staff at Deportivo Alavés two years later, being named his successor late into the second-tier campaign and eventually leading the team to safety.

On 12 June 2015, after again managing to stay afloat, López left the Mendizorrotza Stadium. In 53 league games in charge, he collected 19 wins and 20 losses.

López returned to Valladolid on 26 April 2016, taking the place of the dismissed Miguel Ángel Portugal.

Style of play
A player with good one-on-one skills, López had a weakness in crossing situations.

Honours
Valladolid
Segunda División: 2006–07

References

External links

1969 births
Living people
Sportspeople from Irun
Spanish footballers
Footballers from the Basque Country (autonomous community)
Association football goalkeepers
La Liga players
Segunda División players
Segunda División B players
Real Sociedad B footballers
Real Sociedad footballers
Real Valladolid players
Basque Country international footballers
Spanish football managers
Segunda División managers
Deportivo Alavés managers
Real Valladolid managers